Joelinton Cássio Apolinário de Lira (born 14 August 1996) is a Brazilian professional footballer who plays as a attacking midfielder for Premier League club Newcastle United. Starting his career with Sport Recife, Joelinton joined Hoffenheim in 2015, and was loaned to Rapid Wien for two years from 2016. He has also been capped for the Brazil under-17 national team.

Club career

Sport Recife
Born in Aliança, Pernambuco, Joelinton joined Sport Recife in 2012 and spent two years playing in the youth team. He was promoted to the senior squad in 2013, but it was not until March 2014 that he made his professional debut, in a Copa do Nordeste match against city rivals Santa Cruz. He came on as a 62nd-minute substitute for Neto Baiano in the 2–1 away semi-final win (4–1 aggregate). Sport won the cup with a 3–1 aggregate win over Ceará in the final; Joelinton did not play. He was on the bench six times in the Campeonato Pernambucano season, which they also won.

In the 2014 Campeonato Brasileiro Série A season, Joelinton made seven appearances towards the end of the campaign. He scored his first career goal on 23 November in a 2–2 home draw with Fluminense, and on the last day he scored the only goal against São Paulo after four minutes.

Joelinton established himself in the first team in the 2015 state league. However, he received two straight red cards in the second phase, against Santa Cruz and Náutico.

1899 Hoffenheim
In June 2015, 1899 Hoffenheim signed Joelinton on a five-year contract. He played only once in his first season in Germany, as a last-minute substitute for Jonathan Schmid in a 1–0 loss at Schalke 04 on 18 December.

Loan to Rapid Wien
On 23 June 2016, Joelinton was loaned to Rapid Wien for two years. He made his debut on 8 July in the first round of the Austrian Cup against Regionalliga Ost club FC Karabakh Wien, scoring the opening goal of a 3–1 victory. In the semi-finals on 26 April 2017, he scored an added-time winner at home to LASK Linz as Die Grün-Weißen reached the final for the first time in 12 years. He equalised in the final at the Worthersee Stadion on 1 June, but FC Red Bull Salzburg won 2–1.

Joelinton played all ten of Rapid's 2016–17 UEFA Europa League matches, scoring in a 3–2 win over Genk on 15 September and a 1–1 draw with Athletic Bilbao at the Allianz Stadion on 8 December. On the domestic front in the Austrian Football Bundesliga, he recorded 8 goals in 33 games – including one to cap a 4–1 victory at city rivals FK Austria Wien on 7 August – but the Viennese club finished 5th of 10 teams and missed out on European football.

On 22 July 2017, the first game of the new season, Joelinton was sent off after 23 minutes in a 2–2 home draw with SV Mattersburg, for kicking back after being fouled by Michael Novak.

Return
On his return to Hoffenheim, Joelinton was given a first start in a DFB-Pokal first round match at 1. FC Kaiserslautern, and scored a hat-trick in a 6–1 victory. He netted his first Bundesliga goal on 22 September to open a 1–1 home draw with Borussia Dortmund, and as a substitute on 23 October he scored an added-time equaliser for a 3–3 draw against Lyon in a Champions League group game at the Rhein-Neckar-Arena.

Newcastle United

On 23 July 2019, Joelinton joined Newcastle United on a six-year deal for a reported club record fee of £40 million. He made his debut on 11 August, starting in their 1–0 home loss to Arsenal; he and teammate Miguel Almirón were criticised by the club's all-time record scorer Alan Shearer for their performances.

Joelinton scored his first Premier League goal on 25 August in a 1–0 victory away at Tottenham Hotspur. It took him until 14 January 2020 to score his second goal for the club, netting the final goal in a 4–1 FA Cup Third Round replay victory over Rochdale. He scored his first home league goal on 21 June in a 3–0 win over Sheffield United, ending a 2,130-minute drought. Joelinton scored two goals in 38 appearances for the club, of which six came from the bench in the 2019–20 season. In the 2020–21 season he doubled his tally to four goals, which came from 31 appearances of which eight were from the bench.

After Eddie Howe took over as Newcastle United manager during the 2021–22 season, Joelinton was moved from a forward to a box-to-box central midfielder, receiving praise from fans and pundits for his efforts and performances. He was awarded the Newcastle United Player of the Year Award for the 2021–22 season.

International career
Joelinton was capped four times by the Brazil under-17 national team in 2012, scoring two goals.

Personal life
Joelinton has been in a relationship with Thays Gondim since 2015. The couple have two children together and announced in December 2022 they were expecting a third. In February 2023, Joelinton and Gondim held a gender reveal party on the pitch at St James’ Park.

Joelinton was arrested in the early hours of 12 January 2023 in Newcastle upon Tyne and charged with drink driving his Mercedes G-Wagen. He pleaded guilty at Newcastle Magistrates Court two weeks later and received a 12-month driving ban, to be reduced to nine months in the event of rehabilitation. He was fined £29,000, in addition to a £2,000 surcharge and £85 costs.

Career statistics

Honours
Sport Recife
Campeonato Pernambucano: 2014
Copa do Nordeste: 2014

Newcastle United
EFL Cup runner-up: 2022–23

Individual
Newcastle United Player of the Year: 2021–22

References

External links

Joelinton career stats – Topforward
footballzz.co.uk

1996 births
Living people
Sportspeople from Pernambuco
Brazilian footballers
Brazil youth international footballers
Association football forwards
Sport Club do Recife players
TSG 1899 Hoffenheim players
SK Rapid Wien players
Newcastle United F.C. players
Campeonato Brasileiro Série A players
Bundesliga players
Austrian Football Bundesliga players
Premier League players
Brazilian expatriate footballers
Expatriate footballers in Germany
Expatriate footballers in Austria
Expatriate footballers in England
Brazilian expatriate sportspeople in Germany
Brazilian expatriate sportspeople in Austria
Brazilian expatriate sportspeople in England